Alan Hitchcox (born 14 May 1938) is an Australian cricketer. He played in eleven first-class matches for South Australia between 1958 and 1960.

See also
 List of South Australian representative cricketers

References

External links
 

1938 births
Living people
Australian cricketers
South Australia cricketers
Cricketers from Adelaide